
Massive online open research (MOOR) is an online research and development (R&D) open access platform or higher education study program aiming at unlimited participation via the internet.

It may be used to create, on a very large participative scale, a new discovery, development or creation which will be allegedly accompanied by a peer-review publication.

As a higher education online research program

In September 2013, The University of California in San Diego bioinformatics department, proposed a massive online open course which would feature "an opportunity (for students) to work on specific research projects under the leadership of prominent bioinformatics scientists".

As an online internet platform

Several internet platforms have shown their interest in bridging prominent science, technology, engineering and mathematics (i.e., STEM fields) researchers with students, as means to accelerate STEM discoveries and education.  The internet social network Research Gate has unveiled that multiple discoveries and advancements in science have been made collaboratively in an open access scheme since its creation, essentially serving as a MOOR platform.

The University of Amsterdam has been developing an online tool for massive online open research since February 2014. This tool will primarily focus on collaborative (qualitative) data analysis.

See also

General topics
 Massive online open course
 Open Science
 Open Access
 Open education
 Open research

References

External links
 USCD Bioinformatics Algorithms (Part 1) 

Research methods
Engineering disciplines